Phil Davis was an English professional footballer who played as a defender. He spent six seasons in the North American Soccer League and at least one in the second American Soccer League. He has three children, Todd Davis, Keith Davis and Meredith Davis Gorman, a reporter for the New England Sports Network.

Personal life 
He died on 25 December 1997.

External links
NASL Stats

Footballers from Sheffield
American Soccer League (1933–1983) players
Boston Minutemen players
Cleveland Cobras players
English footballers
English expatriate footballers
Connecticut Bicentennials players
Montreal Olympique players
North American Soccer League (1968–1984) players
Rochester Lancers (1967–1980) players
Toronto Blizzard (1971–1984) players
Living people
1944 births
Association football defenders
English expatriate sportspeople in the United States
Expatriate soccer players in the United States
English expatriate sportspeople in Canada
Expatriate soccer players in Canada